Nicholas Cadden (born 19 September 1996) is a Scottish professional footballer who plays as a winger for Barnsley. Cadden has previously played for Airdrieonians, Livingston, Ayr United and Greenock Morton. He is the twin brother of Chris Cadden.

Career

Airdrieonians
Cadden joined Airdrieonians following his release from Motherwell. He made his first team debut on 16 November 2013 against Dunfermline and scored his first competitive goal over two years later on 26 December 2015 against Peterhead. He left at the end of the 2015–16 season.

Livingston
Cadden signed for West Lothian side Livingston in summer 2016 ahead of the club's first and only year in Scottish League One. He scored on his first competitive match for the Lions, in a 3–2 loss to St Mirren. He made his league debut in August against former side Airdrieonians and went on to play 33 more games in his first season, scoring 6 goals; Livingston were promoted as champions.

In the 2017–18 Scottish Championship, Cadden appeared 26 times (around half from the bench) as the club finished runners-up, and was then selected for all four playoff matches, Livi defeating Dundee United and Partick Thistle to progress to the Premiership.

Loan to Ayr United
On 31 January 2019, Cadden moved to Scottish Championship club Ayr United until the end of the 2018–19 season.

Greenock Morton
In June 2019, Cadden signed for Greenock Morton on a one-year contract.

Forest Green Rovers
Cadden joined League Two club Forest Green Rovers on 3 July 2020. After not conceding a goal all month and contributing to four out of his side's five goals, the attacking wing-back was awarded the league's Player of the Month award for September 2021. Following Forest Green Rovers' title winning campaign, Cadden was named in both the EFL League Two Team of the Season at the EFL Awards and the PFA League Two Team of the Year. Cadden was offered a new contract at the end of the 2021–22 season.

Barnsley
On 11 July 2022, Cadden joined newly relegated League One club Barnsley on a two-year deal.

Personal life
Nicky's twin brother Chris Cadden currently plays with Hibernian F.C. Their father Steve won a lower division title with Albion Rovers. The brothers attended Our Lady's High School, Motherwell, one year group ahead of fellow footballer Kieran Tierney.

Career statistics

Honours
Livingston
Scottish League One : 2016–17

Forest Green Rovers
EFL League Two: 2021–22

Individual
 PFA Team of the Year: League Two 2021–22
 EFL League Two Team of the Season: 2021–22
EFL League Two Player of the Month: September 2021

References

External links

1996 births
Living people
People educated at Our Lady's High School, Motherwell
Footballers from Bellshill
Twin sportspeople
Scottish twins
Scottish footballers
Association football midfielders
Motherwell F.C. players
Airdrieonians F.C. players
Livingston F.C. players
Ayr United F.C. players
Greenock Morton F.C. players
Forest Green Rovers F.C. players
Barnsley F.C. players
Scottish Professional Football League players
English Football League players